NAWC car refer to:
 Naval Air Warfare Center, a research organization for the US Navy
 Newham Asian Women’s Collective, predecessor of the London Black Women's Project